Henry Bevington (26 July 1777 – 8 November 1850) was a prolific English organ builder, active in London during the Victorian era. Many of his organs were erected in Australia and South Africa.

Bevington was born in London to Samuel and Elizabeth (Portsmouth) Bevington, who were Quakers. He was an apprentice of Ohrmann & Nutt, and also of John Snetzler. He began his trade as journeyman with Robert Gray. He set up his own workshop in Greek Street, Soho, London in 1794,  his earliest recorded organ is dated 1820.

Bevington was also an accomplished organist and was the organist at King's College, London.

He died in 1850, aged 73, and was buried at St Peter's Church, Walworth.

Bevington & Sons

Bevington's organ building business was continued by his sons; Henry and Martin, in Rose Street, Soho, in the same premises as were occupied by Ohrmann. The organ of St. Martin's in the Fields and of the Foundling Hospital in London, and that of St. Patrick's Cathedral, Dublin, were built by the Bevington firm.

On 21 May 1854, a fire damaged his works on Rose Street, including the original carved case being constructed for St. Martin's in the Fields, and valuable tools. Fortunately, the majority of their inventory was at the Greek Street location.

Some organs built by Bevington & Sons
St. George's Cathedral, Cape Town (17 February 1861)
 The Foundling Hospital, London (1855)
St Swithin's Church, Wickham (1851)
St Peter and St Paul and St Elizabeth Catholic Church, Coughton (c.1855)
Nottingham Mechanics' Institution (17 October 1849)
St Mary's Cathedral, Sydney (c. 1838)
 St Michael and St George Cathedral, Grahamstown (1860)
 Church of St. John the Evangelist, Kensal Green (1846) 
 The chapel at Stanbrook Abbey
English College, Rome
All Saints' Church, Turnditch 1891
 Parroquia de la Concepción, Santa Cruz de Tenerife (1862)
 All Saints' Church Dunedin 1877
Hatley St George church, Cambridgeshire – a small Bevington organ of 1878
St Thomas Church, Corstorphine - built 1843, now much altered from original concept
St Peter's Church, Radford 1869

See also 
George Fincham
List of pipe organ builders

Notes and references

Further reading

 

1777 births
1850 deaths
English classical organists
Organ builders of the United Kingdom
Pipe organ building companies
British pipe organ builders
People from London